Marc Berman (born October 31, 1980) is a politician and attorney, currently serving as a member of the California State Assembly. He is a Democrat representing the 24th Assembly District, encompassing parts of the San Francisco Peninsula and Silicon Valley, including Campbell, Mountain View, and Saratoga. Before being elected to the Assembly, he was a member of the Palo Alto City Council.

Early life and education 
Berman was born in Dallas, Texas and raised in Palo Alto, California. He is Jewish. After graduating from Palo Alto High School, where he served as student body president. In 2002, Berman earned a Bachelor of Arts degree in Political Science from Georgetown University. He then earned a Juris Doctor from the USC Gould School of Law. In college, Berman worked in Congresswoman Anna Eshoo's office and as an analyst in the United States Department of Justice Civil Rights Division.

Career 
After graduating from law school, Berman worked as an attorney at Latham & Watkins and Merino Yebri, LLP. He also worked provided pro bono representation to clients seeking protection under the Violence Against Women Act and individuals seeking asylum from the Democratic Republic of the Congo. Before his election to the California State Assembly, Berman served as a member of the Palo Alto City Council.

2016 California State Assembly

2018 California State Assembly

2020 California State Assembly

2022 California State Assembly

References

External links 
 
 Campaign website

Democratic Party members of the California State Assembly
Living people
Jewish American state legislators in California
21st-century American politicians
1980 births
Georgetown College (Georgetown University) alumni
University of Southern California alumni
People from Palo Alto, California
People from Menlo Park, California
California city council members
21st-century American Jews